Digital Domain is an American visual effects and digital production company based in Playa Vista, Los Angeles, California. The company is known for creating digital imagery for feature films, advertising and games from its locations in California and Vancouver, British Columbia, Canada, including its own virtual production studio.

History
The company was founded by film director James Cameron, Stan Winston and Scott Ross. They began producing visual effects in 1993 with its first three films, True Lies, Interview with the Vampire, and Color of Night, being released in 1994.

Digital Domain produced effects for more than 100 films, including Dante's Peak, Titanic, Apollo 13, What Dreams May Come, The Fifth Element, Armageddon, Star Trek: Nemesis and The Day After Tomorrow. Other films include Pirates of the Caribbean: At World's End, The Curious Case of Benjamin Button, Transformers: Revenge of the Fallen, G.I. Joe: The Rise of Cobra, 2012, Percy Jackson & the Olympians: The Lightning Thief, TRON: Legacy, Thor, X-Men: First Class, Transformers: Dark of the Moon, Real Steel, G.I. Joe: Retaliation, Oblivion, Iron Man 3, Her, X-Men: Days of Future Past, Into the Storm, Maleficent, Furious 7, Pixels and more recently Deadpool, The Huntsman: Winter's War, X-Men: Apocalypse, Suicide Squad, Beauty and the Beast, Spider-Man: Homecoming, Avengers: Infinity War, Aquaman, Captain Marvel, Shazam, Avengers: Endgame, Terminator: Dark Fate and Sonic the Hedgehog.

Early 2000s 
In 2000, Digital Domain designed the digital character that represented Motorola's intelligent assistant, Mya. In October 2002, Digital Domain launched a wholly owned subsidiary, D2 Software, Inc., to market and distribute its Academy Award-winning compositing software, Nuke.

In 2002–2003, Digital Domain co-produced its first feature film, Secondhand Lions, written and directed by Tim McCanlies and starring Michael Caine, Robert Duvall, Haley Joel Osment, and Kyra Sedgwick.

The founders were known for feuding, principally due to conflicts over the film Titanic (1997), which almost destroyed the company. Founder Scott Ross announced plans of raising $100 million in financing to become more active as a production company. This plan never materialized and the corporate owners forced management to seek a buyer of the company.

2006–present 
In May 2006, Digital Domain was purchased by an affiliate of Wyndcrest Holdings, LLC, a private holding company whose principals then included Wyndcrest founder John Textor, director Michael Bay, former Microsoft executive Carl Stork and former NFL player and sports television commentator Dan Marino. In connection with the acquisition, Mr. Textor and Mr. Bay would become co-chairman of Digital Domain and Mr. Stork was named CEO.  Wyndcrest also acquired The Foundry in 2007, which was tasked with taking over the development of Nuke, a visual effects compositing tool that has since become one of the world's top selling visual effects software solutions. The Foundry business was then subject to a management buy-out in 2009.

In 2009, Digital Domain parent company DDMG launched Tradition Studios in Florida to develop and produce original, family-oriented CG animated features. The studio moved on January 3, 2012, to a new  facility in Port St. Lucie, built with the city's incentives. The studio attracted a number of talented creators, including Aaron Blaise, the director of Brother Bear, and Brad Lewis, co-director of Cars 2, who together were developing an animated feature film The Legend of Tembo for a planned 2014 release, with Aaron Blaise and Chuck Williams directing.

In 2011, Digital Domain Media Group entered into the film production business with a major investment into the feature film Ender's Game, which was a co-production with OddLot Entertainment and Summit Entertainment. The film was released November 1, 2013.

In November 2011, DDMG took the company public through an initial public offering (IPO), and the company was listed on the NYSE under the symbol DDMG, achieving a market valuation of more than $400 million.

In 2012, DDMG announced initiatives to open VFX studios in Beijing China and Abu Dhabi. Also in 2012, subsidiary Digital Domain created a virtual likeness of the late rap star Tupac Shakur for Dr. Dre's and Snoop Dogg's show at the Coachella Valley Music and Arts Festival that gained worldwide recognition. Digital Domain also announced that the company would create virtual Elvis Presley in partnership with CORE Media Group.

In 2015, the UFC hired Digital Domain to create a commercial series for their UFC 189 event.

In 2016, the Pokémon Company hired Digital Domain to create the visual effects for their "Train On" Super Bowl ad, released to celebrate the Pokémon series' 20th anniversary.

In 2017, Voltron Chronicles, a VR game Digital Domain co-developed with Universal based on Netflix's Voltron Legendary Defender, went live. Fans can play this game on PSVR, Oculus Rift and HTC Vive for $15.

Financial difficulties
During the 2000s, and today, the visual effects industry has continued to be a financial challenge for nearly every services-only visual effects company.  DDMG and Co-chairman John Textor believed it necessary to expand the business into film production, content ownership and new media. His aggressive North American expansion plans were heavily supported by nearly $200 million of new capital from private investors, the State of Florida and the city of Port Saint Lucie (Florida).  After a doubling of revenues since its acquisition in 2006, and with significant operating cashflow in 2010, DDMG also completed a successful IPO capital raise of $40 million in November 2011. Unfortunately, Textor's heavily funded Florida expansion plans could not overcome the continuing negative cash flow of Digital Domain's primary visual effects business, nor could the company successfully navigate the failure of its principal lender and major shareholder, Lydian Private Bank, which occurred in the summer of 2011 during the peak of DDMG's capital consumption related to the Florida studios launch.  Lydian's sizable stake in DDMG was sold to a hedge fund affiliated with Florida Power & Light and ultimately traded to known toxic lender and hedge fund Tenor Capital, which engaged in heavy short-selling of DDMG's publicly listed stock as a strategy to pull cash proceeds from the daily trading of DDMG stock. The IPO, which was once thought to be the key to funding the future of DDMG, became the vehicle by which hedge funds could prevent the company from accessing capital while profiting from the decline in DDMG's stock price. Tenor became a stakeholder in DDMG in early May 2012, with DDMG stock price trading at an all-time high, but DDMG would soon be unable to access the cash needed to fund its Venice operations and its Florida studio growth. Documents and emails provided to the press show that Digital Domain believed it had options to put cash into the company but were thwarted by Tenor Capital, which had significant weight as a chief lender and according to Palm Beach Capital and the Tenor strategy may have been shorting DDMG stock to profit from its failure. When a deal to fund the company was thwarted on July 31, Tenor Capital cited a violation of a minimum cash covenant and demanded $51 million on August 20 as repayment for its $35 million loan made four months earlier. The lenders appointed Mike Katzenstein as interim chief operating officer of the company who acted without conferring with DDMG senior management, deciding to close the Florida studio, causing Chairman John Textor to submit a letter of resignation "in profound disagreement" with this decision.  It was announced on September 7, 2012, that all of DDMG's Port St. Lucie's operations, including Tradition Studios, were to be shut down, laying off nearly 300 newly trained and recruited employees.

On September 11, 2012, Digital Domain Media Group Inc. filed for Chapter 11 bankruptcy protection after the company's hedge fund lenders alleged the company defaulted on a minimum cash covenant relating to a $35 million loan.  DDMG's lenders proposed a deal to sell its operating businesses – Digital Domain and Mothership—to stalking horse Searchlight Capital Partners, a private investment firm, for $15 million. At the public auction on September 21, 2012, Digital Domain's visual effects business and its principal animation feature film properties were instead acquired by a joint venture led by a leading DDMG shareholder Beijing Galloping Horse America, LLC in partnership with Reliance MediaWorks (USA) The sale was approved on September 24, 2012.

The bankruptcy and financial restructuring of Digital Domain triggered a number of lawsuits, naming John Textor, former Apple CEO John Sculley and the entire Board of Directors, the auditors and others involved in the business and in the IPO offering. In February 2015, the Supreme Court of the State of New York ordered a convincing summary judgment in favor of John Textor, and the other Digital Domain defendants, terminating the principal lawsuit that had consolidated the outstanding investor claims. The Court found no evidence of fraud or misrepresentation and confirmed that DDMG accurately disclosed its financial situation to investors. The Court further ordered the plaintiffs to reimburse Mr. Textor for his fees and court costs.  In her 26-page opinion, New York Supreme Court Judge Debra James ruled contrary to the investors’ claims, stating that the evidence “conclusively established” that plaintiffs were not misled and DDMG painted a realistic picture of the company's financial situation in SEC filings. The Court further ruled that there was no evidence that Mr. Textor and the other defendants made false or misleading statements or misrepresentations of material facts.

Palm Beach Capital, the largest investor in DDMG, identified hedge funds, Tenor Capital et al., as the primary cause of the company's difficulties, citing unlawful finance penalties and possible illegal short selling strategies designed to damage the company's public stock price. Ultimately, the hedge fund lenders of DDMG agreed to settle the outstanding claims by the DDMG parties through a May 2016 settlement agreement that awarded $8.5 million to former CEO John Textor and $3 million each to the city of Port Saint Lucie and the state of Florida.

In July 2013, approximately nine months after bankruptcy forced by a $35 million lender, majority ownership in Digital Domain was acquired by Hong Kong listed public company Sun Innovation, placing an approximate $3.5 billion valuation on Digital Domain, with Reliance MediaWorks continuing to own the minority stake.  Mr. Daniel Seah, who had spearheaded the bankruptcy acquisition and protection of Digital Domain by DDMG shareholder Beijing Galloping Horse America, LLC was appointed CEO.

Digital Humans Group
The company maintains a Digital Humans Group sub-division, presently headed by Darren Hendler, which provides scanning and digitization services to create digital reproductions of humans. The processes uses two programs, Masquerade and Direct Drive, which use a combination of high-resolution scans and motion capture technology, and the generated data can then be mapped and animated.

Filmography

1990s

2000s

2010s

2020s

Upcoming

Digital Domain Television

Awards
Digital Domain artists and technologists have been recognized with seven Academy Awards: three for Best Visual Effects (Titanic, What Dreams May Come, The Curious Case of Benjamin Button); and four for Scientific and Technical Achievement for its proprietary technology—i.e., for Track (tracking software), for Nuke (compositing software), for Storm (volumetric renderer), and for its fluid simulation system.

The company's work has been nominated for five Academy Awards for Best Visual Effects (Apollo 13, True Lies, I, Robot, Real Steel and Transformers: Dark of the Moon). In addition, its excellence in digital imagery and animation has earned Digital Domain multiple British Academy (BAFTA) Awards.

Digital Domain's Advertising division provides digital imagery and animation for television commercials, working with top commercial directors. To date, it has been awarded 37 Clio Awards, 22 AICP awards, 9 Cannes Lion Awards and numerous other advertising honors. The Advertising division has also produced multiple music videos working with artists that include The Rolling Stones, Faith Hill, Creed, Janet Jackson, Busta Rhymes, Björk, Celine Dion, Michael Jackson and Nine Inch Nails, and has earned Grammy and MTV "Music Video of the Year" Awards.

See also
 Industrial Light & Magic
 Sony Pictures Imageworks
 Wētā FX
 Wētā Workshop
 Cinesite
 Rhythm & Hues
 Framestore
 Moving Picture Company (MPC)
 DNEG
 Image Engine
 Lego Alpha Team (video game)

References

Further reading
 Bizony, Piers. (2001) Digital Domain: the leading edge of visual effects, London: Aurum Press.

External links
 

1993 establishments in California
American companies established in 1993
American animation studios
Best Visual Effects Academy Award winners
Entertainment companies established in 1993
Computer animation
Special effects companies
Television and film post-production companies
Visual effects companies
Companies based in Los Angeles
Companies that filed for Chapter 11 bankruptcy in 2012
James Cameron